The Serra do Mar tyrant-manakin (Neopelma chrysolophum), or Serra do Mar neopelma or the Serra tyrant-manakin, is a species of bird in the Pipridae, or manakin family.  It is endemic to humid mountain forest and woodland in south-eastern Brazil. It was formerly considered a subspecies of Wied's tyrant-manakin.

References

External links
"Serra tyrant-manakin" videos on the Internet Bird Collection
Graphic and Article

Serra do Mar tyrant-manakin
Birds of the Atlantic Forest
Endemic birds of Brazil
Serra do Mar tyrant-manakin
Taxonomy articles created by Polbot